The Intermediate League World Series Europe–Africa Region is one of six International regions that currently sends teams to the World Series in Livermore, California. The region's participation in the ILWS dates back to 2014.

Europe–Africa Region Countries

 /

Region Champions
As of the 2022 Intermediate League World Series.

Results by Country
As of the 2022 Intermediate League World Series.

See also
Europe–Africa Region in other Little League divisions
Little League
Junior League
Senior League
Big League

References

Intermediate League World Series
Europe-Africa
Recurring sporting events established in 2014